The FCW Southern Heavyweight Championship was a professional wrestling heavyweight championship owned and promoted by Florida Championship Wrestling (FCW, now known as NXT Wrestling), the developmental territory of WWE. It was contested for in their heavyweight division. The championship was created and debuted on June 26, 2007 at a FCW house show.

Harry Smith became the inaugural champion by winning a 21-man battle royal. The title was retired on March 22, 2008, after being unified with the FCW Florida Heavyweight Championship.

Reigns

References

Heavyweight wrestling championships
United States regional professional wrestling championships
Southern Heavyweight Championship